Ardley is an English surname derived from a toponym and may refer to:

 George Ardley (1897–1927), English footballer
 Neal Ardley (born 1972), British footballer
 Neil Ardley (1937–2004), British musician and writer

See also
Ardley (disambiguation)

English toponymic surnames
English-language surnames
Surnames of British Isles origin